Ahli Kamboh is a village in Sahiwal Tehsil of Sargodha District in Punjab, Pakistan. 

Populated places in Sargodha District